"Text from Your Ex" is a hip hop song by British rapper Tinie Tempah featuring guest vocals from American singer Tinashe. It was released on 20 January 2017, as the fourth single from his third studio album, Youth (2017).

Track listing
Digital download
"Text from Your Ex" (featuring Tinashe) – 3:25

Digital download
"Text from Your Ex" (Billon Remix) (featuring Tinashe) – 4:53

Charts

Certifications

References

2017 singles
2017 songs
Tinie Tempah songs
Tinashe songs
Parlophone singles
Songs written by Ina Wroldsen
Songs written by Tinie Tempah
Songs written by Jax Jones
Songs written by Grades (producer)
Song recordings produced by Jax Jones